The list of shipwrecks in 1989 includes ships sunk, foundered, grounded, or otherwise lost during 1989.

January

1 January

6 January

7 January

10 January

11 January

14 January

18 January

21 January

26 January

29 January

February

15 February

22 February 1989

March

3 March

5 March

13 March

18 March

19 March

21 March

24 March

26 March

28 March

30 March

April

7 April

10 April

23 April

25 April

27 April

28 April

30 April

May

6 May

11 May

14 May

15 May

16 May

June

1 June

2 June

3 June

13 June

16 June

18 June

19 June

20 June

23 June

27 June

Unknown date

July

5 July

9 July

11 July

12 July

22 July

25 July

August

8 August

10 August

12 August

15 August

19 August

20 August

21 August

29 August

Unknown date

September

8 September

10 September

14 September

15 September

17 September

23 September

October

9 October

11 October

17 October

18 October

25 October

29 October

30 October

Unknown date

November

2 November

20 November

December

2 December

4 December

8 December

9 December

17 December

19 December

Unknown date

References

1989
 
Ship